The Serra da Cantareira is a Brazilian mountain range to the north of the city of São Paulo in the São Paulo state. The area has many walking trails, and is popular among locals. The Pico do Jaraguá, São Paulo's highest point, is located there. It was in "Serra da Cantareira" where the famous Brazilian band "Mamonas Assassinas" died in a plane crash.

References

External links
Sao Paulo Official Parks site - Serra da Cantareira

Cantareira
Landforms of São Paulo (state)